Lake Carezza is a small alpine lake in the Dolomites in South Tyrol, Italy. It is known for its wonderful colors and its view of the Latemar mountain range.

Characterization
The name of the lake derives from "Caricaceae", a family of plants with broad lobed leaves.

The lake is located in the western Dolomites on the edge of the Latemarwald, just 20 kilometers southeast of Bolzano at 1520 m altitude in the municipality Welschnofen. The nearest settlement is Carezza. The roughly 300 m long and 140 m wide stretch of water is fed by underground springs from the Latemar mountain range.

Today the lake is one of the classic tourist destinations of the Trentino-Alto Adige. In the winter, it is visited by divers who record documentaries of the colors of the underground waters. The small mountain lake is famous for its calm waters, of dark green color, and the beautiful panorama of mountains in the background.

Gallery

References 
Civic Network of South Tyrol 
Lago di Carezza

External links 

Lakes of South Tyrol